Cecilia Nkemdilim Okoye (born 13 September 1991) is an American-born Nigerian basketball player for B.B.C. Etzella and the Nigerian national team.

Early life
She was born in New York to Nigerian parents.

International career
She participated at the 2017 Women's Afrobasket. she averaged 4pts, 2.4rebounds and 0.5 assists per game during the tournament for the D'Tigress. The team won Gold at the tournament.

Nigeria Club Career
She played for the Nigerian side First Bank women's basketball club of lagos also known as the Elephant Girls during the 2017 FIBA Africa champions cup for women tournament at Angola. The  tournament took place from 10–19 November, while the Spanish league was not yet started. She averaged 10.3pts, 5.3 rebounds and 1 assists per game during the tournament.

References

External links

1991 births
Living people
Forwards (basketball)
Nigerian expatriate basketball people in Poland
Nigerian expatriate basketball people in Spain
Nigerian expatriates in Albania
Nigerian expatriates in Slovenia
Nigerian women's basketball players